India has participated all 13 South Asian Games governed by South Asia Olympic Council.

Hosted games 
India has hosted this Multi-Sport Event three times: 1987 Calcutta, 1995 Madras, 2016 Guwahati/Shillong.

Detailed Medal Count

See also 
India at the Olympics
India at the Paralympics
India at the World Games
India at the Asian Games
India at the Commonwealth Games
India at the Lusofonia Games

References 

 
South Asian Games
Nations at the South Asian Games